Arul Ramadas is a politician from Salem, Tamil Nadu. He started his political career as a cadre and held various offices in Pattali Makkal Katchi.  He is currently serving as Salem district secretary of PMK.

He was elected as a Member of the State Legislature from Salem West constituency in the 2021 Tamil Nadu Legislative Assembly election. He launched a website to communicate with his constituency voters and people to keep in touch with them and He is the first MLA in India to launch mobile MLA office in which he meets people at their own place to avoid people’s discomfort and personally ask people's problems.

Electoral performance

References 

Pattali Makkal Katchi
People from Salem district
Living people
1971 births
Tamil Nadu MLAs 2021–2026
Tamil Nadu politicians